Phosphila miselioides, the spotted phosphila, is a species of cutworm or dart moth in the family Noctuidae. It was described by Achille Guenée in 1852 and is found in North America.

The MONA or Hodges number for Phosphila miselioides is 9619.

References

Further reading

 Arnett, Ross H. (2000). American Insects: A Handbook of the Insects of America North of Mexico. CRC Press.
 Crabo, L.; Davis, M.; Hammond, P.; Mustelin, T. & Shepard, J. (2013). "Five new species and three new subspecies of Erebidae and Noctuidae (Insecta, Lepidoptera) from Northwestern North America, with notes on Chytolita Grote (Erebidae) and Hydraecia Guenée (Noctuidae)". ZooKeys. 264: 85–123.
 Lafontaine, D. & Troubridge, J. (2010). "Two new species of the Euxoa westermanni species-group from Canada (Lepidoptera, Noctuidae, Noctuinae)". ZooKeys. 39: 255–262.
 Lafontaine, J. Donald & Schmidt, B. Christian (2010). "Annotated check list of the Noctuoidea (Insecta, Lepidoptera) of North America north of Mexico". ZooKeys. 40: 1–239.

Noctuinae